Cynthia M. Mendes (born June 14, 1980) is an American politician serving as a member of the Rhode Island Senate from the 18th district. Elected in November 2020, she assumed office on January 5, 2021.

Education 
Mendes earned an associate's degree in social sciences from the Community College of Rhode Island. She is also a certified orthodontic assistant and dental radiology technician.

Career 
From 2004 to 2017, Mendes was a clinical supervisor at an orthodontics clinic in Barrington, Rhode Island. She later worked as a manager at Big Brothers Big Sisters of Rhode Island. She was elected to the Rhode Island Senate in November 2020 and assumed office on January 5, 2021.

Mendes has announced her intention to run for lieutenant governor of Rhode Island in the 2022 election.

References

External links

1980 births
21st-century American politicians
21st-century American women politicians
Community College of Rhode Island alumni
Hispanic and Latino American state legislators in Rhode Island
Hispanic and Latino American women in politics
Living people
Democratic Party Rhode Island state senators
Women state legislators in Rhode Island